Yellowjacket Pass may refer to:
 Yellowjacket Pass (Archuleta County, Colorado), a mountain pass in Archuleta County, Colorado, United States
 Yellowjacket Pass (Rio Blanco County, Colorado), a mountain pass in Rio Blanco County, Colorado, United States
 Yellow Jacket Pass (Routt County, Colorado), a mountain pass in Routt County, Colorado, United States
 Yellow Jacket Pass (Washington), a mountain pass in Skamania County, Washington, United States

See also